A testamentary disposition is any gift of any property by a testator under the terms of a will.

Types
Types of testamentary dispositions include:
 Gift (law), assets that have been legally transferred from one person to another
 Legacy, testamentary gift of personal property, traditionally of money but may be real or personal property
 Life estate, a concept used in common and statutory law to designate the ownership of land for the duration of a person's life
 Demonstrative legacy, a gift of a specific sum of money with a direction that is to be paid out of a particular fund

See also
Testator
Codicil (will)

References

Wills and trusts